Safdarganj is a village in the district of Barabanki and state of Uttar Pradesh in India. It is one of the developed and well known villages of Barabanki District. This is situated some 15 km east of Barabanki, a district of Uttar Pradesh, one of major states in India.
Railway station power house is available .
F C J R Inter college was established in 1956.

References
http://upgov.up.nic.in/spatrika/
http://wikimapia.org/#lat=26.9142637&lon=81.3539582&z=18&l=0&m=a&v=2
http://indiarailinfo.com/arrivals/1753
http://scholarship.up.nic.in/RURAL_SCH_SUMM.ASP?DCODE=46&BCODE=MASAULI&GP=SAFADARGANJ

Villages in Barabanki district